Roger Dallier (4 November 1919 - 29 September 1993) was a French assistant director and film director.

Filmography 
Director
1949 : Mademoiselle de La Ferté
1973 : Du plomb dans la tête 
1976 : Larguez les amarres !
1979 : Le Crime des innocents 
1980 : La Petite valise 

Assistant director
1946 : Le Pays sans étoiles by Georges Lacombe
1947 : La Kermesse rouge by Paul Mesnier 
1948 : Les Condamnés by Georges Lacombe
1948 : Le Carrefour des passions by Ettore Giannini 
1951 : Juliette, or Key of Dreams by Marcel Carné 
1953 : Leur dernière nuit by Georges Lacombe
1956 : L'Homme aux clefs d'or by Léo Joannon
1957 : Le Désert de Pigalle by Léo Joannon
1958 : Mon coquin de père by Georges Lacombe
1961 : Amazons of Rome by Carlo Ludovico Bragaglia and Vittorio Cottafavi 
1961 : Dynamite Jack by Jean Bastia 
1962 : L'assassin est dans l'annuaire by Léo Joannon
1963 : Les Abysses by Nikos Papatakis 
1963 : Le bon roi Dagobert by Pierre Chevalier  
1966 : Trois enfants... dans le désordre by Léo Joannon
1967 : Un idiot à Paris by Serge Korber 
1967 : Les Arnaud by Léo Joannon 
1970 : L'Ardoise by Claude Bernard-Aubert

References

External links 

Roger Dallier on AlloCiné

French film directors
People from Creuse
1919 births
1993 deaths